Taryn Rockall (born 11 November 1977) is an Australian soccer player. She played for the NSW Sapphires in the Women's National Soccer League (WNSL), Arsenal in the FA Women's Premier League and later for the Central Coast Mariners in the Australian W-League during the 2008–09 season. She won the Julie Dolan Medal twice, in 2001–02 and 2004–05, as best player in the WNSL.

Club career 
During the 1998–99 season, Rockall was a member of the Arsenal team that won the FA Women's League Cup/Women's FA Cup double.

Rockall made her debut for Central Coast Mariners in the W-League against Melbourne Victory on Saturday, 25 October 2008 after being substituted on for teammate Teresa Polias.

International career
Rockall made her debut for Australia against France in January 2001. She was a member of the Australian team who won the 2003 OFC Women's Championship. Rockall was a member of the Australia team at the 2003 FIFA Women's World Cup.

Honours

Club 
NSWIS/NSW Sapphires
 Women's National Soccer League Championship: 1997–98, 1999–2000, 2003–04

Arsenal
 FA Women's League Cup: 1998–99
 Women's FA Cup: 1998–99

International 
Australia
 OFC Women's Championship: 2003

Individual 
Awards
 Julie Dolan Medal: 2001–02, 2004–05

Performances
 WNSL leading goalscorer: 2000–01

References

External links
 Central Coast Mariners FC profile

1977 births
Living people
Australian women's soccer players
Central Coast Mariners FC (A-League Women) players
2003 FIFA Women's World Cup players
Australia women's international soccer players
Women's association football midfielders
Arsenal W.F.C. players